Swedish Universities Scales of Personality (SSP) is a personality test based on the older Karolinska Scales of Personality (KSP).
It is originally in Swedish but has been translated to English.
The personality profile is presented in t-score (mean 50 and standard deviation 10).
Both the SSP questionnaire and the scoring algorithm is free of charge.

Personality dimensions
SSP includes 91 items and yields 13 personality scales:
 Somatic trait anxiety
 Psychic trait anxiety
 Stress susceptibility
 Lack of assertiveness
 Impulsiveness
 Adventure Seeking
 Detachment
 Social Desirability
 Embitterment
 Trait Irritability
 Mistrust
 Verbal trait aggression
 Physical trait aggression

References

See also 
 Revised NEO Personality Inventory
 Temperament and Character Inventory

Personality tests